Naples Is Always Naples (Italian: Napoli è sempre Napoli) is a 1954 Italian musical melodrama film directed by Armando Fizzarotti and starring Lea Padovani, Renato Baldini and Ubaldo Lay.

The film's sets were designed by the art director Franco Lolli.

Cast
 Lea Padovani as Carmela Gargiulo 
 Renato Baldini as Pietro Cafiero 
 Ubaldo Lay as Il tunisino 
 Beniamino Maggio as Un pescatore 
 Valeria Moriconi as Doris 
 Carlo Ninchi as Andrea Cafiero 
 Tina Pica as Donna Bettina 
 Giuseppe Porelli
 Alberto Sorrentino
 Franco Ricci as Franco Ricco 
 Achille Togliani as Carlo Rindi 
 Mimo Billi
 Fedele Gentile
 Amedeo Girardi
 Salvo Libassi 
 Mario Passante
 Anna Pretolani as Mariannina

References

Bibliography 
 Chiti, Roberto & Poppi, Roberto. Dizionario del cinema italiano: Dal 1945 al 1959. Gremese Editore, 1991.

External links 
 

1954 films
Italian musical drama films
1950s musical drama films
1950s Italian-language films
Films directed by Armando Fizzarotti
Films set in Naples
1954 drama films
Italian black-and-white films
1950s Italian films